Manukau is a former New Zealand parliamentary electorate in the south Auckland Region. It existed from 1881 to 1978, with a break from 1938 to 1954.  It was represented by nine Members of Parliament. Two by-elections were held in the electorate.

Population centres
The previous electoral redistribution was undertaken in 1875 for the 1875–1876 election. In the six years since, New Zealand's European population had increased by 65%. In the 1881 electoral redistribution, the House of Representatives increased the number of European representatives to 91 (up from 84 since the 1875–76 election). The number of Māori electorates was held at four. The House further decided that electorates should not have more than one representative, which led to 35 new electorates being formed, including Manukau, and two electorates that had previously been abolished to be recreated. This necessitated a major disruption to existing boundaries.

There was no adjustments in the number of electorates between the South and North Islands, but the law changes resulted in boundary adjustments to almost every electorate through the 1952 electoral redistribution; only five electorates were unaltered. Five electorates were reconstituted (including Manukau) and one was newly created, and a corresponding six electorates were abolished; all of these in the North Island.

The electorate was in the southern section of greater Auckland, and was centred on Manukau.

History
The electorate existed from 1881 to 1938 and then from 1954 to 1978. It was represented by nine Members of Parliament.

Matthew Kirkbride was elected to the Manukau electorate in the 1902 general election, and held the electorate until he died in 1906.  His death caused the 6 December 1906 Manukau by-election, which was won by Frederic Lang.

Bill Jordan was first elected in the 1922 general election and was confirmed in the next four elections.  When the Labour Party won the 1935 general election and formed the First Labour Government of New Zealand, Jordan expected a cabinet position.  Instead, he was appointed to the post of New Zealand High Commissioner to the United Kingdom, which had until that point been traditionally a retirement post for former cabinet ministers.  His resignation from Parliament caused the 30 September 1936 Manukau by-election, which was won by Arthur Osborne.

Members of Parliament
Key

Election results

1975 election

1972 election

1969 election

1966 election

1963 election

1960 election

1957 election

1954 election

1936 by-election

1935 election

1931 election

1928 election

1925 election

1922 election

1919 election

1906 by-election

1899 election

1890 election

Notes

References

Historical electorates of New Zealand
New Zealand electorates in the Auckland Region
1881 establishments in New Zealand
1954 establishments in New Zealand
1938 disestablishments in New Zealand
1978 disestablishments in New Zealand